Zhang Shuai was the defending champion and successfully defended her title, defeating Dalma Gálfi in the final, 4–6, 7–6(7–2), 6–2.

Seeds

Main draw

Finals

Top half

Bottom half

References 
 Main draw

Ando Securities Open - Singles